Rieah Holder (born 15 August 1993) is a Barbadian netball player who represents Barbados internationally and plays in the positions of wing attack and centre. She made her maiden World Cup appearance representing Barbados at the 2019 Netball World Cup. She also represented Barbados at the 2018 Commonwealth Games, which also marked her maiden Commonwealth Games appearance.

References 

1993 births
Living people
Barbadian netball players
Netball players at the 2018 Commonwealth Games
Commonwealth Games competitors for Barbados
2019 Netball World Cup players
University of the West Indies alumni
Sportspeople from Bridgetown